Gay Dog Food is a 2014 mixtape by American rapper Mykki Blanco. It features contributions from Cakes da Killa, Cities Aviv, and Kathleen Hanna, among others.

Critical reception

On October 29, 2014, Stereogum named Gay Dog Food the "Mixtape of the Week". MTV News named it one of the "23 Albums That Should Have Gone Platinum in 2014".

Track listing

References

Further reading

External links
 

2014 mixtape albums
Mykki Blanco albums